Claudiu George Negoescu (born 23 April 2003) is a Romanian professional footballer who plays as a midfielder for Liga I club UTA Arad.

References

External links
 

2003 births
Living people
Footballers from Bucharest
Romanian footballers
Association football midfielders
Romania youth international footballers
Liga I players
FC UTA Arad players
Liga II players
FC Metaloglobus București players